Erythrolamprus ingeri is a species of snake in the family Colubridae. The species is found in Venezuela.

References

Erythrolamprus
Reptiles of Venezuela
Endemic fauna of Venezuela
Reptiles described in 1958
Taxa named by Janis Roze